TSS St David was a passenger vessel built for the Great Western Railway in 1947.

History

TSS St David was built by Cammell Laird in 1947 as one of a pair of vessels with TSS St Patrick. St David was launched on 6 February 1947 by the Countess of Dudley, wife of the deputy chairman of the Great Western Railway. She entered service at Fishguard in July 1947.

In 1969 she was transferred to the Holyhead to Dun Laoghaire service. In 1971 she was sold to Greek owner Handris Lines and was renamed Holyhead. She never entered service under Handris ownership and was scrapped in 1979.

References

1947 ships
Passenger ships of the United Kingdom
Steamships of the United Kingdom
Ships built on the River Mersey
Ships of the Great Western Railway
Ships of British Rail